Spruce Grove-Stony Plain is a provincial electoral district in Alberta, Canada. The district is one of 87 districts mandated to return a single member (MLA) to the Legislative Assembly of Alberta using the first past the post method of voting. It was contested for the first time in the 2019 Alberta election.

Geography
The district is located west of Edmonton, containing the City of Spruce Grove and the Town of Stony Plain. The district boundaries match the municipal boundaries of the two communities. It is bisected by Highway 16A and bordered by the Yellowhead Highway to the North.

History

The district was created in 2017 when the Electoral Boundaries Commission recommended abolishing Spruce Grove-St. Albert and Stony Plain, creating a district that is well above the provincial average in population. The Commission reasoned this was preferable to placing part of either community in a neighbouring district.

Electoral results

Elections in the 2010s

References

Alberta provincial electoral districts